The first USS Patchogue (ID-1227), later YFB-1227, was a United States Navy ferry in service from 1917 to 1922.

Patchogue was built in 1912 as a commercial wooden-hulled steam ferry of the same name by Robert Jacobs at City Island in the Bronx, New York. In 1917, the U.S. Navy purchased her from the Boston, Nahant and Pines Steamship Company for use during World War I. Delivered to the Navy on 29 September 1917 and assigned the naval registry identification number 1227, she entered service as USS Patchogue (ID-1227).

Assigned to the 3rd Naval District, Patchogue operated as a ferry at Submarine Base New London in New London, Connecticut. When the U.S. Navy adopted its modern hull number system on 17 July 1920, Patchogue was classified as a "ferryboat" (YFB) and redesignated YFB-1227. In June 1921, she was transferred to the 4th Naval District for service in the Delaware River-Delaware Bay area.

Placed out of service in 1922, Patchogue was sold to Charles Carr of Keansburg, New Jersey, on 16 June 1922.

References
 
 Department of the Navy Naval History and Heritage Command Online Library of Selected Images: Civilian Ships: Patchogue (American Steam Ferryboat, 1912). Served as USS Patchogue (ID # 1227, later YFB-1227) in 1917–1922
 NavSource Online: Section Patrol Craft Photo Archive Patchogue (ID-1227), YFB-1227

Auxiliary ships of the United States Navy
World War I auxiliary ships of the United States
Ships built in City Island, Bronx
1912 ships